Rasmus Sebastian Holmén (born 29 April 1992) is a Swedish professional footballer who plays as a centre back for Allsvenskan club IF Elfsborg. He is known for his passing-skills and strong positioning. A full international between 2015 and 2020, he won six caps for the Sweden national team.

Club career

Elfsborg
Holmén made his debut in Allsvenskan on 22 April 2013 against Djurgårdens, replacing injured Jon Jönsson. He was later invited to the Sweden U21 to play against Switzerland and Cuba U20.

Dynamo Moscow
On 18 February 2016, he moved to Russia on a 3.5-year contract with Dynamo Moscow. On 12 June 2019, he left Dynamo upon the expiration of his contract.

Willem II
On 24 July 2019, he signed a two-year contract with the Dutch club Willem II.

International career 
Holmén was a part of the Sweden U21 team that won the 2015 UEFA European Under-21 Championship. He made his full international debut for the Sweden national team on 15 January 2015 in a friendly 2–0 win against the Ivory Coast, replacing Johan Mårtensson in the 89th minute. On 16 March 2022, he announced his retirement from international football after having won six caps for his country between 2015 and 2020.

Personal life
Sebastian is the younger brother of the former Sweden national team midfielder Samuel Holmén.

Career statistics

Club

International

Honours
Sweden U21
UEFA European Under-21 Championship: 2015

References

External links
 Sebastian Holmén at IF Elfsborg 
 
 

1992 births
Living people
People from Borås
Association football defenders
Swedish footballers
Allsvenskan players
Russian Premier League players
Eredivisie players
IF Elfsborg players
FC Dynamo Moscow players
Willem II (football club) players
Sweden under-21 international footballers
Sweden international footballers
Swedish expatriate footballers
Expatriate footballers in Russia
Expatriate footballers in the Netherlands
Swedish expatriate sportspeople in Russia
Swedish expatriate sportspeople in the Netherlands
Sportspeople from Västra Götaland County